An early-season tornado outbreak impacted the Southeastern United States on January 12, 2023. The result of a mid-level trough moving through, moisture and the presence of a strong low-level jet aided in the development of numerous severe and tornadic thunderstorms. Early in the outbreak, a strong EF2 tornado caused considerable damage in Winston County, Alabama, while another EF2 tornado struck just south of Greensboro. A destructive high-end EF2 tornado struck Selma, causing widespread damage and two injuries. The same storm produced a long-lived EF3 tornado that moved through or near Old Kingston, Titus, Equality, and Lake Martin, resulting in seven fatalities and several injuries in Autauga County alone. Another EF2 tornado from the storm struck areas in or around Five Points and Standing Rock before crossing into Georgia. After the dissipation of that tornado, nine more tornadoes, five of which were strong, caused heavy damage across west-central Georgia, especially in LaGrange, Griffin, and Experiment, the second one of which was impacted by four tornadoes in the span of 10 minutes, including two that were rated EF2 and EF3 respectively. Another EF2 tornado from the storm caused major damage and another fatality in the Jackson Lake area as well; an indirect death from the tornado also occurred the following day. Elsewhere, other tornadoes caused damage in Sumter and Mobile counties in Alabama, as well as parts of Mississippi, Tennessee, Kentucky, Illinois, and the Carolinas. In all, 41 tornadoes were confirmed.

Meteorological synopsis

On January 11, the Storm Prediction Center outlined a level 1/Marginal risk across the Mid-South valid for the overnight and early morning hours. Although the environment was initially capped, conditions were expected to become more conducive for severe weather given the approach of a mid-level trough and a gradually moistening airmass. A more substantive threat for organized severe weather evolved on January 12, when the organization issued a level 3/Enhanced risk centered along central and eastern Alabama and northwestern portions of Georgia. Here, numerical weather prediction models indicated the presence of 6.5 C/km mid-level lapse rates and 500-1000 J/kg convective available potential energy (CAPE) values supportive of transient supercells and bowing segments. As such, a large 5% risk for tornadoes was introduced for most of the lower Tennessee Valley, including portions of Mississippi, Alabama, Georgia, southern Tennessee, and northwestern South Carolina.

As the day advanced, a more focused corridor for enhanced tornado potential became evident across central Alabama and northwestern Georgia, where effective storm-relative helicity – a measure of the potential for updrafts in supercells – topped 300 m2/s2 and CAPE values rose into the 1,000-1,500 J/kg range. Despite these favorable parameters, the possibility for strong tornadoes, above EF2 intensity, was not included in this outlook. However, as the morning advanced, a defined line of severe thunderstorms with embedded supercell structures and multiple discrete supercells developed across the highlighted area. Multiple tornadoes, some of which were significant, touched down and caused extensive damage. Numerous PDS tornado warnings were issued for the towns of Heiberger, Selma, and Movico in Alabama as large and destructive tornadoes were reported. The same storm that hit Selma prompted tornado emergencies for Autauga, Elmore, Chilton, Coosa, and Tallapoosa counties before crossing the Alabama–Georgia border to continue northeast into Georgia. As the event unfolded, the SPC introduced a 10% hatched risk for tornadoes in their 20:00 UTC outlook across east-central Alabama and western Georgia. The long-tracked supercell (originating in Louisiana) that produced the Selma tornado, as well as the deadly Autauga County tornado, produced more tornadoes as it progressed to the northeast; these included an EF2 tornado that crossed from Chambers County, Alabama into Troup County, Georgia, another EF2 tornado that caused severe damage in the southern part of LaGrange, and a third EF2 tornado that caused severe damage in Meriwether County. The storm's mesocyclone than broadened out and produced four tornadoes on the west side of Griffin, including one that was rated high-end EF2 and another that was rated high-end EF3.  In total, the National Weather Service issued 221 severe thunderstorm warnings, 68 tornado warnings, and three tornado emergencies during the severe weather outbreak.

Confirmed tornadoes

January 12 event

Selma, Alabama

This large, destructive high-end EF2 tornado caused major damage in the city of Selma. The tornado first touched just northeast of Orrville near the intersection of SR 22 and County Road 999 at 12:04 p.m. CST (18:04 UTC). Moving northeastward along SR 22, the tornado damaged several mobile homes and pushed them off their foundations. A frame home sustained minor damage, some trees and power poles were downed in this area as well, and damage along this initial segment of the path was rated EF1. EF1 damage continued as the tornado impacted Beloit, where a church had its steeple and part of its roof blown off, homes sustained roof damage, and trees were snapped. After causing additional tree damage along SR 22, the tornado began to rapidly intensify as it approached the southwestern city limits of Selma, and many large hardwood and softwood trees were snapped at EF2 intensity in this area. The now strong tornado then crossed SR 219 as it entered the southwest side of Selma, causing significant damage along Old Orville Road. Multiple houses were heavily damaged and had their roofs torn off along this corridor, and a few sustained some loss of exterior walls. Severe tree damage occurred as well, as many large trees were snapped or uprooted in residential areas. Reaching high-end EF2 strength, the tornado struck the Crosspoint Christian Daycare along Cooper Drive, inflicting severe structural damage to the building, which sustained collapse of its roof and several brick exterior walls. At the time of the tornado, 70 children were inside the daycare along with staff workers. One baby received a minor cut from the tornado, with no other injuries occurring at that location. The nearby Crosspoint Christian Church had a substantial amount of metal roofing torn off, and debris was scattered throughout the area. EF2 damage continued beyond this point as the tornado moved northeastward along West Dallas Avenue, inflicting significant structural damage to homes. An ophthalmologist's office near Office Park Circle was severely damaged and had much of its roof torn off, while many large trees were snapped or uprooted, some of which landed on houses.

Further to the northeast, high-end EF2 damage occurred at the Selma Country Club, where the clubhouse building suffered major damage to its roof and exterior walls, a few other buildings on the property also had extensive damage, several extremely large hardwood trees were blown down, and many softwood trees were snapped. Maintaining high-end EF2 intensity, the tornado then struck the northern part of downtown Selma. Damage here mainly consisted of numerous of trees being snapped or uprooted, some of which fell on homes, and many homes and other buildings that had their roofs and some exterior walls removed. A couple of older residences that were built on brick piling foundations collapsed, cars were flipped, signs were destroyed, and numerous power poles were snapped. The historic Reformed Presbyterian Church was badly damaged, and its adjacent church school was almost completely destroyed. As the tornado crossed over Broad St (US 80/SR 22), a strip mall had much of its roof torn off, and a nearby metal warehouse building sustained major damage, with metal framing being twisted and failure of x-braces observed. Apartment buildings were also badly damaged, and debris from structures was strewn across streets, or left tangled in power lines or wrapped around trees. Past the downtown area, the tornado weakened slightly to mid-range EF2 strength as it crossed Marie Foster Street and moved through neighborhoods in the northeastern part of Selma, where many homes and apartment buildings had roofs and exterior walls torn off, and many trees and power lines were downed. Crossing SR 41, the tornado moved out of Selma and maintained EF2 intensity as it moved to the northeast, though damage in this area was limited to downed trees. As it crossed SR 14, an outbuilding was completely destroyed and a metal free-standing pole was bent to the ground, with damage in this area being rated EF2. Some re-intensification was observed as the tornado then impacted a small residential area along Parkway Drive, where a few houses had roofs torn off with some collapse of exterior walls noted. Another outbuilding in this area was completely destroyed, trees were downed, and damage was rated high-end EF2. Just past this area, the tornado weakened to EF1 strength as it impacted a FEMA trailer storage facility along Selfield Road, where multiple unanchored trailers were damaged, flipped, or destroyed. A final area of EF2 damage occurred nearby, where the Dallas County Jail suffered extensive damage to its roof and fencing. Weakening back to EF1 intensity, the tornado then crossed SR 14 again, snapping trees and damaging some outbuildings. The tornado weakened further as it passed south of Manila, causing minor EF0 tree damage along this segment of the path. It inflicted EF0 damage to a house and dissipated as it crossed SR 140 to the southeast of Burnsville at 12:31 p.m. CST (18:31 UTC), just before reaching the Autauga County line.

Old Kingston–Titus–Equality–Lake Martin–Penton, Alabama

A long-tracked and intense EF3 tornado began in Autauga County, Alabama, nine minutes after the EF2 Selma tornado dissipated. The large multiple-vortex tornado prompted the issuance of three tornado emergencies just north of areas struck by tornadoes 10 days earlier. The tornado first touched down near Independence at 12:40 p.m. CST (18:40 UTC). It initially only caused very minor EF0 tree limb damage as it moved northeastward through sparsely-populated areas. After crossing US 82, the tornado quickly intensified to EF1 strength as it moved northeastward along County Road 40, heavily damaging a home, rolling a shed across the road, and causing tree damage. Continuing northeastward into the Old Kingston community, the tornado rapidly intensified to EF3 strength as it crossed County Road 43. Several mobile homes were obliterated and swept away, with debris being scattered long distances across fields. A frame from one mobile home was thrown  into an open field. The tornado threw multiple vehicles, tossing one truck  through the air and leaving a crater where it impacted the ground. Many large trees were snapped and denuded as well, with some debarked observed. Just to the northeast, the tornado crossed Sandy Ridge Road, where numerous double-wide and single-wide mobile homes were completely obliterated, more vehicles were tossed, and many trees were shredded and partially debarked. Five people were killed in this area in different manufactured homes that were swept away. EF3 damage continued just northeast of this area, as a large metal power pole was bent to the ground near County Road 21. Two nearby frame homes had much of their roofs torn off, with the damage to those residences rated EF2. Next encountering County Road 140, the now large tornado continued to produce EF3 damage as more mobile homes were completely swept away. Two more fatalities occurred in separate homes that were obliterated. The tornado continued to throw vehicles considerable distances, including one pickup truck that had its cab separated from the bed, while many trees were snapped or sheared off. This included entire stands of pine trees that were mowed down east of County Road 140 and along County Road 42. Based on the damage scene and contextual evidence, it was acknowledged by damage surveyors that the tornado may have had stronger winds here.

Beyond this point, the tornado narrowed some, but maintained low-end EF3 intensity as it moved northeastward, snapping and debarking dozens of hardwood trees. A two-story home on the west side of County Road 57 had much of its second floor destroyed, with multiple exterior walls knocked down on both the first and second floors. The tornado weakened slightly to high-end EF2 intensity after crossing the road, tearing the roofs off of two site-built homes and destroying a large outbuilding structure. A few other homes were damaged to a lesser degree in this area, and large trees were snapped. After downing additional trees, the tornado continued at high-end EF2 strength as it crossed over County Road 62. A house in this area sustained major structural damage, losing its roof and some exterior walls, with several walls from the central part of the house being destroyed and strewn into the back yard. A nearby mobile home was destroyed at high-end EF1 strength, and some other site-built homes sustained less severe damage. The tornado then briefly weakened to high-end EF1 intensity, with damage being limited to downed trees, but reached EF2 intensity again and grew in size as it crossed I-65 and US 31 in the Pine Level community south of Marbury. Several homes sustained roof damage, outbuildings were damaged or destroyed, a mobile home was rolled off its foundation and destroyed, and numerous trees were snapped or uprooted in this area. Continuing to the northeast, the tornado produced additional EF2 damage as it moved through the Pine Flat community. Multiple site-built homes had their roofs partially or completely removed, and a mobile home was swept away and destroyed. The Wadsworth Baptist Church, housed in a large metal building, sustained considerable damage as well. Additional EF2 damage continued beyond Pine Flat as a house had its roof torn off and another home sustained roof and exterior wall loss. Numerous trees were snapped or uprooted in this area, and two mobile homes were destroyed.

Continuing at EF2 strength, the tornado crossed into northwestern Elmore County and passed near Lightwood, where more homes were mostly or entirely unroofed, mobile homes were destroyed, and many trees were downed. The tornado briefly weakened to EF1 strength as it crossed the Coosa River, downing multiple trees in a wooded area before it reached EF2 intensity again north of Titus, snapping countless pine trees and unroofing another home as it crossed County Road 29 and Grays Ferry Road. The tornado again weakened to EF1 intensity, downing more trees as it crossed into Coosa County. The tornado then became slightly larger and re-intensified back to EF2 strength as it crossed over US 231, snapping many large trees and inflicting heavy roof damage to a home along County Road 304. Just past this point, the tornado rapidly intensified again as it approached Equality, and a large swath of trees was completely mowed down along McKissick Road. All trees in the center of the path were snapped close to their bases, and some debarking was noted. This area of intense tree damage was given a low-end EF3 rating. The tornado then widened some more as it continued northeastward, causing EF2-level tree damage before strengthening back to EF3 intensity along County Roads 14 and 18 northwest of Equality. Several vehicles were moved or flipped, numerous trees were snapped, and a few site-built homes sustained major structural damage, including a poorly anchored house that was completely leveled.

The tornado then quickly narrowed and weakened back to EF1 intensity as it crossed over SR 9 to the north of Equality, where a mobile home and a site-built home suffered roof damage. The tornado continued into Tallapoosa County as it maintained EF1 strength. Damage along this portion of the path was almost entirely limited to downed trees, though at least one home sustained minor roof damage. The tornado then grew in size again and caused additional EF1 damage as it moved through Wind Creek State Park and over Elkahatchee Creeek just south of Alexander City, snapping more trees before shrinking and re-strengthening back to EF2 intensity as it crossed the Tallapoosa River along the north side of Lake Martin near the US 280 bridge. Many homes were damaged at this location, including several that had their roofs ripped off, and a few that had some loss of exterior walls as well. Boat houses were also destroyed, and dozens of large hardwood trees were snapped and uprooted. The heavy damage in this area was partly attributed to the tornado's interaction with the lake surface, as well as the exposed nature of the homes, since most of the structures inland seemed to be "sheltered" by adjacent heavily wooded areas. This was also the last area of EF2 damage from the tornado. After crossing US 280 near Sturdivant, the tornado weakened significantly to EF0 strength, snapping tree branches and uprooting softwood trees. South of Horseshoe Bend National Military Park near Sessions, the tornado reached EF1 intensity again, snapping or uprooting several trees, damaging outbuildings, and inflicting minor damage to homes. The tornado then weakened back to EF0 intensity, inflicting minor damage to trees and mobile homes several miles south of Daviston, before restrengthening back to EF1 intensity for the last time as it moved into Chambers County, snapping or uprooting several trees. The tornado then weakened to high-end EF0 strength south of Union Hill. It continued to inflict minor damage to outbuildings and downed more trees before striking Penton, where some EF0 tree damage occurred. CST (20:08 UTC) after traveling . A total of seven people were killed by this tornado, and at least 16 others were injured.

Hollonville–Griffin–Experiment–Locust Grove, Georgia

As the EF2 Alps tornado was occluding and weakening, a new circulation southeast of it within the same parent supercell produced this large, intense rain-wrapped tornado that touched down just a mile west of the community of Hollonville in Pike County along SR 362 at 4:10 p.m. EST (21:11 UTC). After causing EF0 tree and roof damage at the beginning of its path, the tornado strengthened to EF1 intensity as it continued to the northeast, snapping and uprooting numerous trees. Around this time, the broad mesocyclone responsible for this tornado produced three other tornadoes in quick succession, while this tornado abruptly turned to the north-northeast and weakened as crossed into Spalding County, producing only sporadic EF0 tree damage. As it reached Blanton Mill Road, the tornado made a sharp to turn to the east and strengthened back to EF1 strength, snapping and uprooting and causing major roof damage to an outbuilding on Rover-Zetella Road as it entered the west edge of Griffin. As it began grow in size after crossing the road, the tornado rapidly intensified to EF3 strength as it entered a small residential subdivision along West Road and Kendall Drive. Several homes were either heavily damaged or completely destroyed in this area, including two poorly anchored homes that were leveled and swept off their foundations. A resident inside one of the homes took shelter in a bathtub which, along with all the plumbing, was ripped off the foundation and thrown into nearby woods, though he was not injured. Intense tree damage was also noted in this area, and winds were estimated to have reached . The tornado then absorbed two of the other tornadoes to its south and weakened to EF2 strength, but grew to over a mile-wide as it crossed SR 16 and moved through additional residential areas in the western part of Griffin. Many trees were downed, and homes in neighborhoods in The Club at Shoal Creek area and along North Pine Hill Drive sustained EF1 to EF2 damage. Maintaining its strength, the tornado then moved into Experiment, an unincorporated community located on the north side of Griffin near the University of Georgia campus.

Multiple homes and some businesses in Experiment suffered extensive damage, with the damage in this area being rated EF1 to EF2. Many power lines and trees were downed, and several large trees fell onto homes, causing major structural damage. A Hobby Lobby had a large portion of its roof torn off, and also sustained partial collapse of masonry exterior walls on the northeast side of the building. Debris was strewn throughout the area, and multiple vehicles were flipped and tossed. The UGA campus suffered EF0 damage, and a weather station in the area recorded a  wind gust as the storm passed by, while another at the UGA Dempsey Farm recorded a wind gust of  before the anemometer instrument was blown off the tower. To the northeast of Experiment, the tornado produced high-end EF1 damage as it moved through the northeastern fringes of Griffin, downing many trees and inflicting moderate to severe damage to homes and other structures near East McIntosh Road. Damage then became less severe and more sporadic as the tornado exited the Griffin area, and the damage path narrowed as it crossed North McDonough Road and Amelia Road. The tornado continued at EF1 intensity as it moved into Henry County. Crossing I-75, the tornado strengthened back to high-end EF1 intensity as it struck two neighborhoods on the south side of Locust Grove. Numerous homes were damaged by tornadic winds or falling trees in this area. The tornado crossed over US 23 and entered neighborhoods in the eastern part of Locust Grove, where more trees were downed, and additional homes were damaged. The tornado exited Locust Grove and continued to the northeast, causing more EF1 damage along Peeksville Road before weakening to EF0 strength as it crossed Wolf Creek Road. The damage path of the tornado became less defined and dissipated near Collins Way at 4:45 p.m. EST (21:45 UTC). Damage assessments indicated that approximately 1,465 homes were affected in the city of Griffin, and 754 were affected in other areas of Spalding County, with at least 250+ that were destroyed or sustained significant damage.

East Griffin–Jenkinsburg–Jackson Lake, Georgia

This large and strong tornado was spawned by a secondary circulation within the same parent supercell that produced the EF3 Griffin tornado to its north, paralleling the path of the stronger tornado. It first touched down just southeast of East Griffin in Spalding County at 4:27 pm EST (21:27 UTC) and moved northeastward. It immediately reached EF1 strength and first snapped or uprooted multiple trees along Crouch Road and Wild Plum Road before striking a Rinnai Corporation building, damaging the roof and exterior walls, and blowing out several windows. The tornado then quickly intensified to high-end EF2 intensity as it crossed SR 16, and a well-built home in this area had severe roof and structural damage, while many large trees were snapped or uprooted as well. As the tornado continued northeastward, it weakened back to EF1 intensity, downing numerous trees as it approached I-75. As it crossed I-75, the tornado became the dominant circulation within the parent supercell as the EF3 Experiment tornado to the north began to occlude and weaken. As a result, this tornado's wind field grew in size as it moved into Butts County, producing high-end EF1 to low-end EF2 damage near Dean Patrick Road and England Chapel Road, as numerous trees were snapped or uprooted in this area. Maintaining its strength, the tornado continued to the northeast and inflicted considerable damage to several homes along Shiloah Road, Plaza Drive, and Smith Drive. The tornado then impacted Jenkinsburg, where trees were downed, and a large warehouse building was significantly damaged along US 23. The roof and exterior walls of the structure were severely damaged, with debris strewn across the roadway. Adjacent to the highway on the Norfolk Southern Railway line, three rail cars on a train were derailed. Some outbuilding structures were also damaged or destroyed, and damage in the Jenkinsburg area was rated high-end EF1 to low-end EF2. The tornado then weakened to EF1 strength as it continued to the northeast of town. The EF3 Griffin tornado to its north then dissipated at 4:45 p.m.

As this tornado passed south of Worthville, it quickly intensified back to EF2 strength, causing widespread significant damage to trees and homes in several neighborhoods along SR 36 west of Jackson Lake. One tree fell on a car on Haley Road, killing the passenger and critically injuring the driver. Maintaining EF2 intensity, the tornado then moved through the southern part Newton County and caused additional major damage to houses in several neighborhoods along the shore of Jackson Lake, both west of and along SR 212. The EF1 tornado to the north of this tornado then dissipated after the latter had entered Jasper County at 4:57 p.m. EST (21:57 UTC). This tornado then caused intermittent EF1 to low-end EF2 damage after crossing the county line. The Bear Creek Marina and several campers were destroyed along this segment of the path. The tornado then became weak, damaging more trees at EF0 intensity as it approached and crossed SR 11, before dissipating near Margery Lake at 5:01 pm EST (22:01 UTC). In addition to the fatality, ten other people were injured. An indirect fatality was attributed to this tornado the following day when a state transportation worker was knocked out of a bucket truck by a falling tree limb while trying to restore powerlines after the storm in Jasper County.

Impacts 
Alabama Governor Kay Ivey declared a state of emergency in Autauga, Chambers, Coosa, Dallas, Elmore and Tallapoosa counties, as did Georgia Governor Brian Kemp for the whole state. These declarations were followed on January 15 by a major disaster declaration in Alabama by President Biden, making federal funds available to victims of the storms (as well as affected local governments, organizations, and businesses) in Autauga and Dallas counties.

Casualties 
At least nine fatalities resulted, eight of which were direct. Seven occurred in mobile homes in Old Kingston, Alabama from an EF3 tornado; the other occurred in Butts County, Georgia when an EF2 tornado knocked a tree down on a car, killing a five-year old passenger and critically injuring the parent driving. This tornado was also responsible for an indirect fatality the following day when a lineman was knocked out of a bucket truck after being struck by a large tree branch while attempting to restore powerlines in Jasper County. Multiple injuries also occurred. An Alabama state trooper was hospitalized when his patrol vehicle was struck by a falling tree.

Closures 
In anticipation of severe weather, multiple school districts closed early in Alabama and Georgia. The University of Georgia's Griffin campus closed because of damage to buildings and trees on campus from an EF3 tornado.

Damage 
Approximately 37,000 people in Alabama and more than 78,000 in Georgia were without power by the evening of January 12, figures which included but were not limited to severe weather outages.

See also

 List of United States tornadoes from January to March 2023
 List of North American tornadoes and tornado outbreaks
 Weather of 2023

Notes

References

External links
 January 12, 2023 Live ABC 33/40 Severe Weather Coverage

2023 meteorology
Tornadoes of 2023
2023 natural disasters in the United States
2023 in Alabama
Tornadoes in Alabama
2023 in Kentucky
Tornadoes in Kentucky
2023 in Illinois
Tornadoes in Illinois
2023 in Mississippi
Tornadoes in Mississippi
2023 in Tennessee
Tornadoes in Tennessee
2023 in Georgia (U.S. state)
Tornadoes in Georgia (U.S. state)
2023 in North Carolina
Tornadoes in North Carolina
2023 in South Carolina
Tornadoes in South Carolina